Janusz Wojnarowicz (born 14 April 1980 in Tychy) is former Polish judoka and an american football player for the Gliwice Lions, a team in the PLFA I. He's also related to Polish football player Jakub Błaszczykowski.

Achievements

References

External links
 
 

1980 births
Living people
Polish male judoka
Judoka at the 2008 Summer Olympics
Judoka at the 2012 Summer Olympics
Olympic judoka of Poland
People from Tychy
Polish players of American football
Sportspeople from Silesian Voivodeship
20th-century Polish people
21st-century Polish people